The Israeli Basketball Premier League 6th Man of the Year, or Israeli Basketball Super League 6th Man of the Year, is an award given to the best 6th man of each season of the Israeli Basketball Premier League, which is the top-tier level men's professional basketball league in Israel.

Winners

References

External links
Israeli League Official website
Eurobasket.com Israeli League Page